John Hope Anderson (May 2, 1912 – May 26, 2005) was a former Republican member of the Pennsylvania House of Representatives.

References

Republican Party members of the Pennsylvania House of Representatives
1912 births
2005 deaths
20th-century American politicians